Mantapsan (or Mount Mant'ap,) is a mountain in the south of North Hamgyong Province in North Korea. It is located on the border between Kilju County, Myŏnggan County and Orang County.  

Political prisoners were reportedly forced to dig tunnels into the southern side of the mountain, at the nuclear test site near P'unggye-ri. The horizontal tunnels are believed to be two to three meters wide and high and hundreds of meters long. This is where the detonations of the North Korean nuclear tests in 2006, 2009, 2013 and 2016 occurred. 

International analysts believe that the sixth and largest explosion, to this date the last, "made the mountain bulge sideways by about 12 feet and collapse vertically by about a foot and a half", with one seismologist describing the subsequent reaction as the mountain "pancaking".

Hwasong concentration camp, at  the largest North Korean concentration camp, is located between Mantapsan and Myŏnggan (Hwasŏng).

See also

List of mountains in Korea
Punggye-ri Nuclear Test Site
2006 North Korean nuclear test
2009 North Korean nuclear test
2013 North Korean nuclear test
January 2016 North Korean nuclear test
September 2016 North Korean nuclear test
2017 North Korean nuclear test

References

Mountains of North Korea